Leon Jan Wyczółkowski (24 April 1852 – 27 December 1936) was one of the leading painters of the Young Poland movement, as well as the principal representative of Polish Realism in art of the Interbellum. From 1895 to 1911 he served as professor of the Jan Matejko Academy of Fine Arts (ASP) in Kraków, and from 1934, ASP in Warsaw. He was a founding member of the Society of Polish Artists "Sztuka" (Art, 1897).

Work 
Wyczółkowski was born in Huta Miastowska near Garwolin in Congress Poland. At first, in his artistic experience he aimed at devoting himself to the genre of historical painting with documentary realism in the detail. After his trip to Paris though, he changed his focus and began implementing solutions typical of the French Impressionists. He painted dramatic landscapes, nudes and pastoral scenes with impasto and impressionist lighting effects (e.g., "Paddling Fishermen"). For a short while he came under the influence of Symbolism (e.g., "Fossilized Druid"), and around 1900 darkened his palette. His work is characterized by a richness of form and complex technical means. Thanks to a friendship with Feliks Manggha Jasieński, he expanded his interests to include oriental scenes as well. Wyczółkowski was a master of flower arrangements and still life. He portrayed almost the entire art world of Kraków.

Wyczółkowski died 1936 in Warsaw. After the war, on the anniversary of his birthday (11 April 1946), the District Museum in Bydgoszcz took up his name in recognition of his outstanding achievements. His widow donated to the museum many of his works and belongings. The Bydgoszcz museum owns one of the largest collections of Leon Wyczółkowski's paintings, drawings and graphics in Poland. The collection is complemented with numerous documents, a rich photographic archive, personal memorabilia, artistic workshop and other original items from his mansion in Gościeradz. The collection, organized into a new department, consists of over 700 works of Leon Wyczółkowski. His most representative impressionist paintings can be found at the National Museum, Kraków, the National Museum, Warsaw and at the Bydgoszcz Museum.

Representative work

See also
List of Polish painters

References 

Gallery of paintings by Wyczółkowski
Leon Wyczółkowski at Kulturalna Polska gallery

1852 births
1936 deaths
People from Garwolin County
Modern painters
19th-century Polish painters
19th-century Polish male artists
20th-century Polish painters
20th-century Polish male artists
Golden Laurel of the Polish Academy of Literature
People from Siedlce Governorate
People from the Russian Empire of Polish descent
Polish male painters